Chay Crista Kerio Cullen,  (born 20 August 1985) is an Olympic Gold Medal-winning English field hockey player.

Hockey career
Cullen made her senior international debut for England in 2003. She was part of the Great Britain squad which won Bronze at the 2012 Summer Olympics in London, as well as the England squad that won Bronze at the 2006 Commonwealth Games in Melbourne.

She retired from international hockey after the 2012 Summer Olympics, aged 27. She earned 171 international caps. She came out of retirement in 2015 to join the Great Britain team for the 2016 Rio Olympics and played an instrumental part in a team that went unbeaten throughout the tournament, eventually winning an Olympic gold medal.

She has played club hockey for Leicester, based at the Stoneygate Preparatory School in Great Glen.

Awards 
She was named in the International Hockey federation World Star XI following the 2006 Hockey World Cup, as well as 2006 Great Britain Hockey Athlete of the Year and Hockey Writers' 2005 and 2006 UK Hockey Player of the Year.

In 2006 and 2008 she was nominated for the FIH Player of the Year Awards (Young Woman) Award and in 2012 she was nominated for the FIH Hockey Player of the Year (Woman) Award.

Cullen was appointed Member of the Order of the British Empire (MBE) in the 2017 New Year Honours for services to hockey.

Personal life
Cullen attended the independent Oakham School in Rutland. She then gained a BA in Business Studies (Strategy & Entrepreneurship) at the Nottingham Business School, gaining a 2.1 in 2006. She works as a Business Development Consultant for The Kennel Club and as Performance Director for Edwin Doran Sports Tours (edwindoran.com). Her father was a golfer and her mother played professional squash. She first played hockey aged nine, when living in Kenya until she was twelve. Her parents still live in Kenya where they run the Hemingways hotel near Watamu. Her brother Gray Cullen played junior rugby for England and in 2009 debuted for the Kenya national rugby union team. Following her success at the 2016 Rio de Janeiro Olympic, Games, Crista Cullen has founded Tofauti which is a charity aimed at making sustained conservational change in Africa. In 2020, Cullen's Tofauti Foundation became the charity partner of the Tofauti Everyone Active junior women and men's cycling team.

References

External links
 

Crista Cullen – Great Britain Hockey Player – Official website
Nottingham Trent University

Video clips
Her guide to hockey (BBC) in 2008

1985 births
Living people
English female field hockey players
People from Boston, Lincolnshire
People educated at Oakham School
Alumni of Nottingham Trent University
Field hockey players at the 2006 Commonwealth Games
Field hockey players at the 2008 Summer Olympics
Olympic field hockey players of Great Britain
British female field hockey players
Commonwealth Games bronze medallists for England
Olympic medalists in field hockey
Olympic bronze medallists for Great Britain
Olympic gold medallists for Great Britain
Field hockey players at the 2012 Summer Olympics
Medalists at the 2012 Summer Olympics
Medalists at the 2016 Summer Olympics
Field hockey players at the 2016 Summer Olympics
Commonwealth Games medallists in field hockey
Members of the Order of the British Empire
Wimbledon Hockey Club players
Medallists at the 2006 Commonwealth Games